The Goon is a comic book series written and drawn by Eric Powell (with colors often by Dave Stewart, Eric or Eric's brother, Robin). The series mixes both a comical and violent atmosphere with a supernatural slant, which pit the titular character against undead creatures/zombies, ghosts, ghouls, mutants, skunk-apes with an unnatural hunger for pies, giant squids, mob/gang leaders, extra-dimensional aliens, mad scientists and robots.

Publication history
An early prototype of The Goon was first published in 1995, in a book called Best Cellars #1 from Out of the Cellar Comics. This prototype was called Monster Boy, and the story was written and illustrated by Eric Powell.

The Goon debuted in Avatar Illustrated (June 1998, Avatar Press) in a 1-page Preview, which is the true first cameo appearance of the character. Powell was unhappy with the quality of the Avatar Press comics after just 3 issues, so he stopped handing in new material and waited for his contract to expire. Once that happened, he was unable to find another publisher, so he moved into self-publishing in 2002 with Albatross Exploding Funny Books. These self-published issues caught the eye of Dark Horse Comics, which approached Powell by telling him that they didn't know why they passed on the book, and in 2003 publication of The Goon moved to Dark Horse.

The book also received a release that would never be reprinted in trade format, Satan's Sodomy Baby.

After Dark Horse Comics published issue #18, The Goon went on hiatus to allow Eric Powell to work on Chinatown, a graphic novel exploring the Goon's backstory, and which was released as Chinatown and the Mystery of Mr. Wicker in 2007. The series returned with issue #19 on July 11, 2007.

A one-shot comic was released titled Dethklok vs. The Goon on July 22, 2009. Both Eric Powell and Brendon Small co-wrote the comic.

Another one-shot comic was released titled "When Freaks Collide" in July 2011. It was a collaboration between the Criminal Macabre comic series and The Goon by Steve Niles, Christopher Mitten, and Eric Powell.

In 2019 Eric Powell's Albatross Funnybooks began publishing a new ongoing Goon series.

Main characters

Creatures
 Zombies: Zombies are the primary servants of the Zombie Priest. Very few seem to be capable of speaking or performing other complex tasks. Raised by necromancy, they are capable of following orders, though only from the Zombie Priest himself. Referred to by Franky and the Goon as "slackjaws".
 Hobos: Hobos are the cannibal overlords of the dark forested region known as the "Hobo Jungul". The culture of the Hobo is apparently completely separate from the rest of the world, so far as they have their own language and resemble cavemen more than humans.
 Brunos: An army of deadly robots designed by Dr. Hieronymous Alloy, all inexplicably sharing the name "Bruno". These drones have a distinctly retro sci-fi aesthetic, and are equipped with weaponry ranging from lasers to boxing gloves.
 Bog Lurks: A race of ogre-like creatures that inhabit the swamps outside of town. Despite their low intelligence, the Bog Lurks' great strength has opened up many career opportunities for them in the city's criminal underworld.
 Hags: Another of the Zombie Priest's monstrous servants, hags' grandmotherly appearance belies their bloodthirsty nature. These creatures do have their tender side, however, as they act as midwives for Mother Corpse's demon spawn.
 The Decasters: The ghosts of a perverse inbred family who haunted an old mansion on the outskirts of the city. While the Decasters had driven most intruders to madness and death, the Goon managed to exorcise them with cats' eyes strung on cinnamon dental floss.
 Skunk Ape: The Skunk Ape is a large, sasquatch-like monster with a hideous odor. The Skunk Ape is driven to homicidal enthusiasm by the scent of pies (especially blueberry).
 Communist Airborne Mollusk Militia: A squadron of immense octopuses who achieve flight via personal zeppelins. While apparently intelligent enough to speak French and operate aircraft, they made the mistake of allying with the Zombie Priest. The Militia was last seen being blown sky high by the Goon and Hellboy.
 Giant Squid: Another cephalopod nuisance for the Goon, the Giant Squid have a tendency to crawl onto land and attack cars along Crestwood Avenue.
 Vampires: A coven of preening, pretentious bloodsuckers who continually find themselves beaten senseless by the Goon. The vampires lurk in one of the city's graveyards, discussing fashion and pursuing other vanities. It is later revealed that they are a diluted form of vampires, fairly disgraceful in their current state.
 Rats: Man-eating rodents the size of St. Bernards, these monsters prowl a lonely stretch known as Rat Alley.
 Chug-Heads: The Chug-Heads have replaced zombies as the bulk of the Zombie Priest's army. Products of Mother Corpse, they are small, dwarf-like creatures with large, potato-shaped heads. Unlike zombies, they are capable of merging into one another to create a larger, more deadly monster.

Miscellaneous characters
 Dwight T. Albatross: Dwight T. Albatross is the irate, often intoxicated friend of Eric Powell who has made many appearances in the comic's letter columns. Albatross is never afraid to speak his mind and often keeps the Machiavellian madness of Eric Powell in check. Dwight had been arrested for destroying issues of The Goon in retribution for his unjust termination at the hands of Powell.

Unlike the rest of Powell's characters, Dwight is 'played' by a real person. Photographs of Albatross appeared in The Goon: Noir, a miniseries done by various creators while Powell worked on Chinatown and other projects. The real Albatross maintains a MySpace page, moderates the message board of The Goon at the Dark Horse Comics website, and appears at the San Diego Comic-Con.

 The Atomic Rage: The Greatest Hero of the Golden Age!, as often advertised in The Goon comics. Sporting a fiery hole in the center of his forehead, this classic-style superhero is known for his foul language and his radioactive (and incredibly angry) brain.
 Margaret Snodgrass: A Southern Bible-thumper who aided in the delay of the issue #18's original story, "Satan's Sodomy Baby". At the 2006 Comic Con, Powell's booth carried fan-made buttons declaring "Screw Snodgrass! Demand Satan's Sodomy Baby!" which were given out as a gift to fans of The Goon.

The Satan's Sodomy Baby "controversy"
Eric Powell revealed on July 5, 2006, in the introduction to The Goon issue #18, that the issue was originally going to be "Satan's Sodomy Baby". That story was allegedly held back due to complaints of a woman called 'Margaret Snodgrass', a fictitious person created by Powell to generate buzz about this 'controversial' issue. Powell wrote that "for various reasons I've decided to hold off on putting that story out". He states that the story is incredibly graphic and he had considered placing a label reading "NOT FOR MINORS" on it. He wrote that Dark Horse, while supporting both him and the issue completely, feared public backlash from its publication, but would eventually put out the issue. Word of the comic's release was allegedly leaked, leading to a threat of a boycott by the fictitious Snodgrass. According to Powell, "a grass-roots movement was started to try to keep retailers from carrying it by a right-wing Bible thumper in Alabama named 'Margaret Snodgrass'. She claimed that the comic was morally reprehensible and contacted local area retailers telling them that even allowing the comic to be stocked on their shelves could lead to their ever-lasting damnation. Some listened to her and threatened to stop carrying The Goon altogether because of this single issue."

Eventually, a release date was set as May 16 with the title changed to "Satan's $@#%* Baby" and carrying a disclaimer. The inside cover, however, maintained the original title "Satan's Sodomy Baby", along with the original cover art. Four pages of the book reprinted several fan letters in support of the struggle against Snodgrass.

There has never been any evidence of a real boycott, no retailers have ever spoken out on the issue, and there is no evidence of Mrs. Snodgrass' existence other than a MySpace page created around the time of Powell's initial announcement and abandoned immediately after the Sodomy issue was released.

In September 2010 on Twitter, Eric Powell confirmed that a sequel to "Satan's Sodomy Baby" was in the works, called as SSB2 to avoid the same issues with the title of the first story.

Spin-offs
A 3-part miniseries featuring the character Buzzard, set after the events of Goon Year (simply entitled "Buzzard") was later published in The Goon: Volume 10.

The Goon: Noir is a series of original short stories by various artists and authors (not including Eric Powell himself), which take place within the world of The Goon. Notable authors include well-known comics such as Tom Lennon, Brian Posehn, and Patton Oswalt.

Not necessarily a spin-off, but maintaining a similar tone while being appropriate for all ages, is another recently published comic by Powell called Chimichanga. Chimichanga is about a bearded girl, a gorilla monster and a witch. Originally a self-published graphic novel, in September 2011 the novel was published in hardcover format by Dark Horse Comics, with colours by Dave Stewart.

Film
The Goon official site said in 2008 that a CG animated film of The Goon was to be produced by Blur Studio and David Fincher and written by Eric Powell. Clancy Brown was to voice The Goon and Paul Giamatti as Franky. A release date was not specified, nor had a plot. The film's future was uncertain as it had trouble procuring funds. The film's poster stated that it will be released theatrically. The first trailer from the film was released on 20 July 2010. Powell updated the film status in January 2012, in his words: "The Goon is in the exact same position it's been in for the past couple of years. Prepping the design and script while searching for funding".

Blur Studio and Fincher launched a 30-day Kickstarter in October 2012, an on-line fundraising campaign, titled "The Goon" Movie... let's KICKSTART this sucker!!!", to raise $400,000 to finance a story reel for the entire film. The Kickstarter page also explained why they need the money: "The Goon film has NEVER been in production. All the work you've seen (animation footage, trailers, artwork, etc.) has been produced independently and out-of-pocket by the creative team of David Fincher, Eric Powell, Blur Studio and Dark Horse Entertainment. We created "proof of concept" footage to show Hollywood the incredible potential of a Goon movie. It was very well received BUT because this movie isn't a sequel or filled with dancing animals we'll need more to bust open the gates and UNLEASH Goon and Franky on Hollywood". Two days before the deadline, the landmark was achieved, and the campaign closed on November 11, raising $441,900 from 7,576 backers. Blur Studios and Tim Miller teased an upcoming announcement in 2017 regarding the film and said it "would happen".

The film was announced to be in development with 20th Century Fox and Chernin Entertainment in 2019, but as a result of the Disney/Fox merger, the film was dropped, entering a search for a new distributor.

In July 2022, Tim Miller announced that the film will be on Netflix with Patrick Osborne set to write and direct the film.

Collected editions
The series is collected in trade paperbacks:

The series has also been collected as hardcover 'Fancy Pants Editions':

Subsequently, the series has been collected in oversized hardcover Library Editions:

Most recently the series has been collected as paperback Omnibus Editions:

There are also two Books that were originally collected or published outside of the main series. They subsequently have been included in the later collected editions, and were originally collected or published as:

Awards
 2004 Eisner Award Winner (tie) – Best Single Issue/Single Story
 2005 Eisner Award Winner – Best Continuing Series
 2005 Eisner Award Winner – Best Humor Publication
 2008 Eisner Award Winner – Best Writer/Artist—Humor
 2008 Eisner Award Winner – Best Painter or Multimedia Artist (interior art)

In other media
In the 2007 film Superbad, Evan is playing a video game in his bedroom while his friend Seth stands in the doorway. During this scene's lively exchange, two different posters for The Goon are clearly visible hanging on the walls next to each actor.

In the 2007 film The Mist, issues of both The Goon & Hellboy are briefly visible on a rotating comic book rack in the scene when Thomas Jane and a small band of survivors venture into a pharmacy to get drugs for the injured at their home base in the adjoining grocery store.

In the 2008 film The Sasquatch Gang, PVC figurines of Goon and Buzzard from the comic are seen on a character's desk.

In The Big Bang Theory episode "The Excelsior Acquisition", a poster can be seen in the comic book shop.

In Degrassi: The Next Generation, the characters Adam and Eli read The Goon and discuss the Chinatown saga.

In the 2018 film Puppet Master: The Littlest Reich, actor Thomas Lennon works at a comic book store where several posters and a t-shirt showcase The Goon.

References

External links
 The Goon Official Site
 The Goon Zone at Dark Horse Comics 
 "The Goon" Movie project at Kickstarter
 video interview with Eric Powell on ExploringTheMultiverse.com
 Eric Powell interviewed on It Came Out on Wednesday at ComiXology
 NEWSARAMA Interview with Eric Powell July 2005

Dark Horse Comics characters
Eisner Award winners for Best Continuing Series
Eisner Award winners for Best Humor Publication
Occult detective fiction
Characters created by Eric Powell
Comics characters introduced in 1999
Vigilante characters in comics